Major League Baseball has numerous records related to runs batted in (RBI).

Key

Players and the columns that correspond are denoted in boldface if they are still actively contributing to the record noted.

160 batted in, one season

Evolution of the single season record for runs batted in

Four or more seasons with 130 runs batted in

Five or more consecutive seasons with 120 runs batted in

Ten or more seasons with 100 runs batted in

Eight or more consecutive seasons with 100 runs batted in

League leader in runs batted in, five or more seasons

League leader in runs batted in, three or more consecutive seasons

League leader in runs batted in, three decades

League leader in runs batted in, both leagues

League leader in runs batted in, three different teams

10 or more runs batted in by an individual in one game

950 runs batted in by a team in one season

See also
 Major League Baseball's Triple Crown

References

Runs bat
Runs bat